Angola is scheduled to compete at the 2017 World Aquatics Championships in Budapest, Hungary from 14 July to 30 July.

Open water swimming

Angola has entered one open water swimmer

Swimming

Angola has received a Universality invitation from FINA to send a maximum of four swimmers (two men and two women) to the World Championships.

References

Nations at the 2017 World Aquatics Championships
2017
World Aquatics Championships